Pál Csernai (21 October 1932 – 1 September 2013) was a Hungarian football player and manager.

Career

Playing career
Born in Pilis, Kingdom of Hungary, Csernai played club football in Hungary, Germany and Switzerland for Budapesti Postás, Csepeli Vasas, Karlsruher SC, La Chaux-de-Fonds and Stuttgarter Kickers.

He also earned two caps for Hungary in 1955.

Management career
After retiring as a player, Csernai managed clubs in Germany, Belgium, Greece, Portugal, Turkey, Switzerland and Hungary.

In the early 1990s, he was involved with the North Korean national team. In June 1991, he signed a six-month contract with the PRKFA, acting as a technical adviser to manager Hong Hyon-chol. During this time, North Korea beat the United States 2–1 in a friendly match. After Hong's sacking in October 1993, the PRKFA turned to Csernai to become the national team's manager. The team left for Qatar to participate in the final round of the Asian qualifiers for the 1994 FIFA World Cup. They started positively, with a 3–2 win over Iraq, but lost the other four matches, with the final one being a 3–0 loss to rivals South Korea. Despite the North Korean authorities' insistence for him to stay on as manager, Csernai returned to Hungary, concerned over their efforts to have him acquire citizenship.

Known for wearing his trade mark silk scarf, he is considered to be the inventor of the so-called "Pal system", a combination of the man-to-man and the zone defenses.

Later life and death
Csernai died on 1 September 2013, after a long illness.

References

1932 births
2013 deaths
People from Pilis
Hungarian footballers
Hungary international footballers
Csepel SC footballers
Hungarian expatriate footballers
Expatriate footballers in Germany
Karlsruher SC players
Hungarian expatriate sportspeople in Germany
Stuttgarter Kickers players
Hungarian football managers
Hungarian expatriate football managers
Royal Antwerp F.C. managers
Expatriate football managers in Belgium
Hungarian expatriate sportspeople in Belgium
Bundesliga managers
FC Bayern Munich managers
FC Bayern Munich non-playing staff
Expatriate football managers in Germany
PAOK FC managers
Expatriate football managers in Greece
Hungarian expatriate sportspeople in Greece
S.L. Benfica managers
Expatriate football managers in Portugal
Hungarian expatriate sportspeople in Portugal
Borussia Dortmund managers
Fenerbahçe football managers
Expatriate football managers in Turkey
Hungarian expatriate sportspeople in Turkey
Eintracht Frankfurt managers
BSC Young Boys managers
Expatriate football managers in Switzerland
Hungarian expatriate sportspeople in Switzerland
Hertha BSC managers
FC Sopron managers
North Korea national football team managers
Expatriate football managers in North Korea
Hungarian expatriate sportspeople in North Korea
Association football midfielders
Sportspeople from Pest County
Expatriate footballers in West Germany
Expatriate football managers in West Germany
Hungarian expatriate sportspeople in West Germany